Panai Kongpraphan (Thai ปณัย คงประพันธ์ ), born June 16, 1983) is a Thai retired footballer. He played for Thailand Premier League clubside BEC Tero Sasana in 2004-2007. Transferred to Nakhon Pathom in 2008 and came back to BEC Tero Sasana in 2009 but less opportunity about position. Until July 2010 Songkhla FC, Thai Division 1 League clubside offered for bought him. Finally, he transferred to Songkhla FC kept secret about him value.

He played for BEC Tero Sasana in the 2004 AFC Champions League group stage, where he scored one goal. He also played for BEC Tero Sasana in the ASEAN Club Championship 2003, scoring a goal as they lost the final to Kingfisher East Bengal FC.

Honours
Thailand U-19
 AFF U-20 Youth Championship: 2002

International goals

Under-19

References

1983 births
Living people
Panai Kongpraphan
Panai Kongpraphan
Association football midfielders
Association football forwards
Panai Kongpraphan